Refia Sultan ("exaltated"; 15 June 1891 –  1938) was an Ottoman princess, the daughter of Sultan Abdul Hamid II and Sazkar Hanım.

Early life

Refia Sultan was born on 15 June 1891 in the Yıldız Palace. Her father was Abdul Hamid II, son of Abdulmejid I and Tirimüjgan Kadın. Her mother was Sazkar Hanım, daughter of Recep Bata Maan and Rukiye Havva Mikanba. She was the only child of her mother and the her father's youngest daughter to reach adulthood. In her childhood, she learned how to play the piano from Lombardi Bey, a French music teacher who also taught other children of the sultan.

Marriage
Towards the end of Abdul Hamid's reign, he bethrothed Refia Sultan to Ali Fuad Bey, the son of Müşir Ahmed Eyüp Pasha. However, at the overthrew of her father in 1909, the princess followed her parents into exile at Thessaloniki. The next year she returned to Istanbul.

The marriage took place on 3 June 1910 on Dolmabahçe Palace, the same day of wedding of her half-sister Hamide Ayşe Sultan. The couple had two daughters, Rabia Hanımsultan born on 13 July 1911, and Ayşe Hamide Hanımsultan born in 1918. 

At the exile of the imperial family in March 1924, the couple and their daughters settled firstly in Nice, France where Hamide died at the age of eighteen in 1936, later the couple settled in Beirut, Lebanon.

According to Neslişah Sultan, she was by far the worldliest among the daughters of Sultan Abdul Hamid II. She was a gracious lady, and her husband Fuad Bey was an excellent husband.

Death

Refia Sultan died at the age of forty seven in 1938 in Beirut, Lebanon and was buried in the cemetery of the Sulaymaniyya Takiyya, Damascus, Syria. Her mother outlived her by seven years dying in 1945.

Honours
 Order of the House of Osman
 Order of the Medjidie, Jeweled
 Order of Charity, 1st Class
 Liakat Medal in Gold
 Iftikhar Sanayi Medal in Gold
 Hicaz Demiryolu Medal in Gold

Issue

Ancestry

References

Sources
 
 
 

1891 births
1938 deaths
Royalty from Istanbul
19th-century Ottoman princesses
20th-century Ottoman princesses
People from the Ottoman Empire of Abkhazian descent
Burials in the cemetery of the Sulaymaniyya Takiyya